A list of Bangladesh films released in 1973.

Releases

See also

1973 in Bangladesh

References

External links 
 Bangladeshi films on Internet Movie Database

Film
Bangladesh
 1973